Laurence (Lorenz) James Vernon Ludovici (19 September 1910 – April 1996) was an American non-fiction author. He was born in Colombo and died in London.

Bibliography
 Cone of Oblivion — A Vendetta in Science. 1961.
 Cosmetic Scalpel: The Life of Charles Willi, Beauty-Surgeon. Bradford-on-Avon: Moonraker Press, 1981.
 Flemming — Discoverer of Penicillin. 1952.
 Great Moments in Medicine.
 Nobel Prize Winners. 1957.
 Origins of Language.
 Seeing Near and Seeing Far: The Story of Microscopes and Telescopes. J. Baker, 1966.
 The Chain of Life: The Story of Heredity.
 The Challenging Sky: The Life of Sir Alliott Verdon-Roe.
 The Discovery of Anaesthesia. New York: Thomas Y. Crowell Company, 1961.
 The Final Inequality: A Critical Assessment of Womans's Sexual Role in Society. New York: Tower Books, 1971.
 The Great Tree of Life. Paleontology: The Natural History of Living Creatures.
 The Itch for Play: Gamblers and Gambling in High Life and Low Life. London: Jarrolds, 1962.
 The Three of Us. London: Marjay Books, 1993.
 The World of The Infinitely Small, Explorations through the Microscope.
 Tomorrow Sometimes Comes: Ten Years Against Tyranny.

References

American male non-fiction writers
1910 births
1996 deaths
20th-century American male writers